The Gulf of Catania is an inlet of the Ionian Sea on the eastern coast of the Italian island of Sicily.

Some twenty miles (or thirty-two kilometres) long and some five miles (eight km) wide, the gulf lies between Cape Campolato to the south and Cape Molini to the north. Mount Etna is close to it, and the Simeto River runs into it below Catania.

Notes

Estuaries of Europe
Catania
Bodies of water of Italy
Landforms of Sicily
Gulfs of the Ionian Sea